.mv is the Internet country code top-level domain (ccTLD) for the Republic of Maldives. It is administered by Dhiraagu Pvt Ltd, a telecommunications company.

Mainly due to the unavailability of an online registration service, a whois lookup and large maintenance cost, the Maldivian ccTLD is used predominantly by government agencies and large businesses.

Second-level Domains
  – Aviation 
  – Business organization  
  – Commercial 
  – Cooperative organization  
  – Educational institutions  
  – Government 
  – Information 
  – International Organization  
  – Military 
  – Museums 
  – Personal 
  – Networks 
  – Organizations 
  – Professionals

External links
 .mv WHOIS information
 Application(s)

Country code top-level domains
Telecommunications in the Maldives
Computer-related introductions in 1996
Internet in the Maldives

sv:Toppdomän#M